Marvin Baudry (born 26 January 1990) is a professional footballer who plays as a defender for  club Laval. Born in France, he is a former Republic of the Congo international.

Club career
Born in Reims, Baudry has played for Amiens and its reserve side.

After not having played in the 2020–21 season, on 28 July 2021, Baudry signed a one-year contract with Laval.

International career
Baudry made his international debut for the Congo in 2014. He was selected as part of the Congo's 26-man provisional squad for the 2015 Africa Cup of Nations in December 2014. Later, he was named to the final squad and became part of the successful performance of the national team at the tournament.

International goals
Scores and results list Congo's goal tally first.

Honours
Zulte Waregem
 Belgian Cup: 2017
Laval

 Championnat National: 2021–22

References

1990 births
Sportspeople from Reims
French sportspeople of Republic of the Congo descent
Living people
French footballers
Republic of the Congo footballers
Republic of the Congo international footballers
Association football central defenders
Amiens SC players
S.V. Zulte Waregem players
Stade Lavallois players
Championnat National players
Championnat National 3 players
Belgian Pro League players
2015 Africa Cup of Nations players
Democratic Republic of the Congo expatriate footballers
Expatriate footballers in Belgium
Democratic Republic of the Congo expatriate sportspeople in Belgium
21st-century Democratic Republic of the Congo people
Footballers from Grand Est
French expatriate sportspeople in Belgium
French expatriate footballers
Black French sportspeople